Shugo Chara! is a 2007 Japanese anime television series based on Peach-Pit's award-winning manga series of the same name. The animated series was produced by Satelight under the direction of Kenji Yasuda and consists of fifty-one episodes. The story follows Amu Hinamori, whose "cool and spicy" exterior belies her introverted personality. When Amu wishes for the courage to be reborn as her "would-be self", she is surprised to find three colorful eggs the next morning, which give birth to three Guardian Characters: Ran, Miki and Su.

The series was first broadcast on TV Tokyo in Japan between October 6, 2007 and September 27, 2008. The episodes were rebroadcast by TV Aichi, TV Hokkaido, TV Osaka, TV Setouchi, and TVQ Kyushu Broadcasting within a few days of the initial broadcast on TV Tokyo. During the week of April 7 to April 13, 2008,  became one of the 10 most watched anime episodes when it received an average household viewership rating of 4.2%. It later returned to the top 10 during the week of July 21–27, 2008, when its July 26 broadcast received an average rating of 4.1%. A second series, Shugo Chara!! Doki—, immediately followed the first series.

Six pieces of theme music by the J-pop group Buono! are used for the first season—two opening themes and four closing themes. Kiss! Kiss!"; and the last twelve episodes, .

Sixteen DVD compilations of three to four episodes each are scheduled for release by Pony Canyon. The first compilation was released on February 20, 2008 with the sixteenth compilation released on May 20, 2009. In addition, four DVD artbox compilations were released. The first three compilations are composed of thirteen episodes, while the fourth compilation is composed of the last twelve. The first artbox compilation was released on March 19, 2008 with the final artbox compilation released on February 18, 2009.



Episode list

See also 
 List of Shugo Chara!! Doki episodes (52-102)
 List of Shugo Chara Party! episodes (103-127)

References
 General

 
 
 
 

 Specific

2007 Japanese television seasons
2008 Japanese television seasons